Penns Creek is a  tributary of the Susquehanna River in central Pennsylvania in the United States.

The creek was called the Kaarondinhah by the Iroquois who were in possession of the Susquehanna Valley from the mid-17th to the mid-18th centuries. Between 1754, when the Iroquois sold most of the Susquehanna Valley including the creek to the provincial government of Pennsylvania, and 1772, it was called both Big Mahany and John Penn's Creek (after the younger brother of Pennsylvania founder William Penn) by the European settlers who moved there.

A large spring within Penn's Cave, a commercial cave that offers guided tours by boat, forms one source for this limestone creek.

The upper reaches of Penns Creek offer some of the best trout flyfishing in the Northeast, with a Green Drake hatch occurring in late May that is one of the largest in the world.  Additional Hendricksons, Sulphurs, and Tricos also attract anglers. As the water travels towards the Susquehanna, the temperatures gradually warm to levels best suited for panfish.

Tributaries
(In order heading downstream)
Sinking Creek
Elk Creek
Pine Creek
Middle Creek

Environmental issues
Ongoing pollution and soil erosion in the region continue to degrade the water quality and the environment locally as well as regionally. Farming, surface mining, wastewater treatment facilities and industrial spills are cited as contributing factors to loss of water quality. It also contributes to the pollution of the Chesapeake Bay. Controlling the wastewater discharges alone is expected to cost local taxpayers millions of dollars.

Organizations
The Lower Penns Creek Watershed Association (LPCWA), the Susquehanna Greenway Partnership, and the Susquehanna River Basin Commission are organizations concerned with Penns Creek. The Snyder County Conservation District and the Union County Conservation District both have watershed specialists that participate in LPCWA.

See also
Mahanoy Creek, next tributary of the Susquehanna River going downriver
Boile Run, next tributary of the Susquehanna River going upriver
List of rivers of Pennsylvania
Penn's Creek Massacre

References

Inch, Bill. A Bi-Centennial Look at Penns Creek Through the Years 1806–2006, The Country Print Shop, Middleburg, Pa., 2006.

External links
Penns Cave
U.S. Geological Survey: PA stream gaging stations

Rivers of Centre County, Pennsylvania
Rivers of Pennsylvania
Rivers of Snyder County, Pennsylvania
Tributaries of the Susquehanna River
Rivers of Union County, Pennsylvania